The Hague Ferry is a cable ferry in the Canadian province of Saskatchewan. The ferry crosses the South Saskatchewan River, as part of Highway 785 near Hague.

The six car ferry is operated by the Saskatchewan Ministry of Highways and Infrastructure. The ferry is free of tolls and operates between 7:00 am and midnight, during the ice-free season.

The ferry transports approximately 10,000 vehicles a year.

See also 
List of crossings of the South Saskatchewan River
Ministry of Highways and Infrastructure
Transportation in Saskatchewan

References

Aberdeen No. 373, Saskatchewan
Cable ferries in Canada
Ferries of Saskatchewan
Rosthern No. 403, Saskatchewan
Division No. 15, Saskatchewan